Mubarak Ghanim Mubarak, (born 3 September 1963), is a footballer from UAE, who played as a centre back for Al Khaleej Club in Sharjah, and the UAE national football team. He formed along with Khalil Ghanim, a hard defence line for the UAE team during their careers. His injury during the preparation for the 1990 FIFA World Cup had denied him from playing in the tournament.

External links

 
 

1963 births
Living people
Emirati footballers
1984 AFC Asian Cup players
1988 AFC Asian Cup players
1990 FIFA World Cup players
United Arab Emirates international footballers
UAE Pro League players
Khor Fakkan Sports Club players
Association football defenders